Raymond Jeffrey Taylor (1 March 1930 – 6 August 2012) is a former professional footballer who played for Wath Wanderers, Huddersfield Town, Southport and Denaby United.

References

1930 births
2012 deaths
English footballers
Footballers from Barnsley
Association football midfielders
Huddersfield Town A.F.C. players
Southport F.C. players
Denaby United F.C. players
English Football League players